Denis Istomin was the defending champion, but chose not to participate this year.

Bernard Tomic won the title, defeating Fabio Fognini in the final, 6–1, 3–6, 7–6(9-7).

Seeds
The top four seeds receive a bye into the second round.

Draw

Finals

Top half

Bottom half

Qualifying

Seeds

Qualifiers

Lucky loser

Qualifying draw

First qualifier

Second qualifier

Third qualifier

Fourth qualifier

References

External links
 Main draw
 Qualifying draw

2018 ATP World Tour
2018 Singles
2018 in Chinese tennis